Issserman is a surname. Notable people with the surname include:

Abraham J. Isserman (1900–1988), American lawyer and activist
Maurice Isserman (born 1951), American historian